Albany station may refer to:

Railway stations

In Australia
 Albany railway station, Western Australia

In Jamaica
 Albany railway station, Jamaica

In the United Kingdom
 Albany Park railway station

In the United States

New York
 Albany–Rensselaer station, the current Amtrak station
 Union Station (Albany, New York), a former station

Oregon
 Albany station (Oregon)

Other uses
 Albany Pump Station, in Albany, New York, US
 Albany busway station, a rapid transit park and ride bus station in Auckland, New Zealand

See also
 Albany (disambiguation)